Arcadia were a new wave British group formed in 1985 by Simon Le Bon, Nick Rhodes, and Roger Taylor of Duran Duran as a side project during a break in the band's schedule. The project was active only during 1985 and 1986 and for just one album, So Red the Rose, which was certified Platinum in the United States and included the singles "Election Day", "Goodbye Is Forever", "The Flame", and "The Promise" (featuring David Gilmour and Sting). Drummer Roger Taylor appeared in only a few band photographs and one music video ("Election Day"), and stated he was to be involved only in the recording side of the project (he also had minor involvement in The Power Station, the other Duran Duran splinter group, formed by Duran Duran's Andy and John Taylor alongside Robert Palmer and Tony Thompson of Chic).

The name of the band reportedly was inspired by the Nicolas Poussin painting Et in Arcadia ego (also known as "The Arcadian Shepherds").

Music career

So Red the Rose (1985)
The group recorded just one album, the platinum-selling So Red the Rose. It peaked at No. 30 in the UK and No. 23 in the US, and featured the UK/US Top 10 single "Election Day", as well as the top 40 hits "The Promise" and "Goodbye Is Forever". It also contains the single "The Flame" and the promo-singles "Missing", "El Diablo", and "Keep Me in the Dark".

Simon Le Bon described So Red the Rose as "the most pretentious album ever made", while AllMusic called it "the best album Duran Duran never made". Musicians who contributed to the album included guitarists David Gilmour (Pink Floyd) and Carlos Alomar, pianist Herbie Hancock, Sting (who provided backing vocals on "The Promise"), Grace Jones (who provided the spoken-word intro/interlude on "The Flame" and "Election Day"), bass player Mark Egan of the Pat Metheny Group (whose distinctive fretless sound can be recognised in "The Promise", "El Diablo", and "Lady Ice"), Masami Tsuchiya, and David Van Tieghem, a percussionist from New York.

A video collection was also released which featured music videos for the singles directed by Roger Christian, Marcelo Anciano, Russell Mulcahy, and Dean Chamberlain. The band also recorded and released the stand-alone single "Say the Word" for the Playing for Keeps movie soundtrack, which was not included on So Red the Rose.

EMI re-released the album as a three-disc box set in April 2010. This remastering collected all permutations and remixes of tracks released by the band. The third disc comprised the video collection on DVD, but it does not include the video for "Say the Word".

Band changes
Arcadia continued the Duran Duran tradition of a slick image. For the Arcadia incarnation of their ever-changing band aesthetic, Le Bon, Rhodes, and Roger Taylor donned an upmarket 'gothic' look of black tuxedos, vintage formal wear, and bow ties. The three also dyed their hair black, as seen when they performed (as Duran Duran, with Andy and John Taylor) at the 1985 Live Aid concert in Philadelphia. By the time the video for their single "The Flame" was made in early 1986 (in which John Taylor made a cameo), Rhodes had changed his hair colour to golden blond and Le Bon had returned to his regular highlighted hairstyle.

Other appearances
The group made a variety of promotional appearances on television, but never toured. When Duran Duran released their Notorious album and toured, "Election Day" was included as part of the set along with "Some Like It Hot" from The Power Station. Drummer Roger Taylor retired from the music business for 15 years after the release of the Arcadia album, but returned in 2001 to rejoin the most famous classic Duran Duran lineup.

Band members
 Simon Le Bon - vocals (1985-1986)
 Nick Rhodes - keyboards (1985-1986)
 Roger Taylor - drums (1985)

Guest musicians
 Carlos Alomar : Guitar
 Pierre Defaye : Violin
 Rafael De Jesus : Percussion
 Jean-Claude Dubois : Harp
 Mark Egan : Bass on "The Promise", "El Diablo", and "Lady Ice"
 David Gilmour : Guitar on "The Promise" and "Missing"
 Herbie Hancock : Piano 
 Steve Jordan : Percussion
 Grace Jones : Voice on "Election Day"
 Andy Mackay : Saxophone
 Sting : Vocals on "The Promise"
 David Van Tieghem : Percussion

Discography

Studio album

Singles

Videography

Video albums

Music videos

References

External links
 So Red The Rose Arcadia archive and fansite

Duran Duran
English art rock groups
English new wave musical groups
English pop music groups
British synth-pop new wave groups
Musical groups established in 1985
Musical groups disestablished in 1986
Spin-offs
1985 establishments in the United Kingdom